Mars Lake (also called Lake Sequilla or Sequilla Lake) is a small spring-fed rural lake in Oneida County in northern Wisconsin in the United States, near the intersection of U.S. Route 45 and U.S. Route 8, about  north of Pelican Lake and  northwest of the small settlement of Monico. It is located between the somewhat larger lakes Neptune Lake and Venus Lake.

Mars Lake is used for fishing. Panfish species include Largemouth Bass, Northern Pike, and Walleye, and Bluegill. There is a boat ramp.

References

Lakes of Oneida County, Wisconsin